Muzical Madness is the second studio album by American musician Jimmy Z. It was released on October 1, 1991 via Ruthless Records and was produced by Dr. Dre. This album is one of the few, if not the only album released by Ruthless Records that is not entirely hip hop based. The album was neither a commercial nor critical success, however the song, "Funky Flute", which featured Dr. Dre, gained some minor success.

Track listing

Notes
"Funky Flute" sampled "Different Strokes" by Syl Johnson (1967)
"Crazy You" is a cover of "Crazy You" by Prince (1978)
"Phone Sexxx" sampled "N.T." by Kool & the Gang (1971), "Ashley's Roachclip" by The Soul Searchers (1974) and "Get Me Back on Time, Engine #9" by Wilson Pickett (1970)
"Evil" sampled "Good Old Music" by Funkadelic (1970)

Personnel
Jimmy "Z" Zavala – main artist, co-producer, vocals, backing vocals (tracks: 2, 9-11, 13), soprano saxophone (track 2), flute (tracks: 3, 6), saxophone (tracks: 4-5), harmonica (tracks: 5-6, 8-12), baritone saxophone (track 10)
Andre "Dr. Dre" Young – producer, vocals (tracks: 1, 3), backing vocals (tracks: 2, 9, 13), drum programming (tracks: 2-6, 9-13), keyboards (tracks: 2, 13)
Andre "L.A. Dre" Bolton – backing vocals (track 2), keyboards (tracks: 2-4, 9)
Cynthia Manley – backing vocals (track 3)
Oneida James – backing vocals (track 4)
Mike "Crazy Neck" Sims – guitar (tracks: 3-4, 6, 8, 11, 13), engineering
David Harvey – guitar (tracks: 3-5, 10), keyboards (tracks: 5, 11)
Colin Wolfe – backing vocals (track 13), bass (tracks: 4, 6, 13)
Teddy Andreadis – backing vocals (track 10), keyboards (tracks: 6, 10)
Brian Kilgore – percussion (tracks: 8, 10)
Worthy Davis – backing vocals (track 10)
Jewell Caples – backing vocals (tracks: 11, 13)
Technical
Donovan Smith – engineering, mixing
Brian Gardner – mastering
Eric "Eazy-E" Wright – executive producer
Gary Ballen – management
Bob Defrin – art direction
Margo Knesz – art direction
Aaron Rapoport – photography
Peter Dokus – photography

References

External links 

1991 albums
Ruthless Records albums
Albums produced by Dr. Dre